Heteroconger is a genus of marine congrid eels. These small, slender garden eels live in groups where each individual has its own burrow. Usually, only the head and front half of the body is visible. The greatest species richness is in the Indo-Pacific, but species are also found in the warmer parts of the Atlantic (including the Caribbean) and the eastern Pacific. Its name relates to how a huge colony of the eels looks swaying in the current.

The garden eel is roughly 40 cm (16 in) long. The eel has large eyes compared to its body, and a weak sense of smell because of its tiny nostrils. It is timid around other animals and people, but slightly aggressive towards other males of its species. If it feels threatened, it retreats into its burrow and closes it with a mucus block so the predator cannot dig into its home. It has a gland in its tail that secretes a sticky substance that keeps the burrow from falling in on itself and burying the garden eel in sand. Scientists have yet to figure out the garden eel's lifespan in the wild.

The garden eel is a carnivore, and eats plankton. Because of its large eyes, it relies mostly on sight to find its food. It catches the plankton by staying in its burrow and swaying its head about to catch the plankton drifting by in the current.

Garden eels are sexual reproducers and sexually dimorphic. In the mating season, the eels move their burrows closer together, until they are within reaching distance. Then, the male picks which female he wants to mate and defends her viciously, biting at the head and even the eyes of any other suitors. The couple mates and the female releases the fertilized eggs, letting them float away and gather around the epipelagic zone. The garden eels develop and hatch out of their eggs while floating in the water and, when they are large enough, swim down to a sand bed and dig a burrow of their own.

One of its top predators, the Pacific snake eel, Ophicthus triserialis, burrows into the sand near a colony, then digs under a garden eel's burrow and grabs its tail. This all happens under the substrate, where the unsuspecting garden eel cannot see what is happening. Trigger fish scare the garden eels into retreating into their burrows, then dig them up and devour them.

Species
The currently recognized species in this genus are:

 Heteroconger balteatus Castle & J. E. Randall, 1999
 Heteroconger camelopardalis (Lubbock, 1980)
 Heteroconger canabus (G. I. McT. Cowan & Rosenblatt, 1974) (white-ring garden eel)
 Heteroconger chapmani (Herre, 1923)
 Heteroconger cobra J. E. Böhlke & J. E. Randall, 1981 (cobra garden eel)
 Heteroconger congroides (D'Ancona, 1928)
 Heteroconger digueti (Pellegrin, 1923) (pale green eel)
 Heteroconger enigmaticus Castle & J. E. Randall], 1999
 Heteroconger hassi (Klausewitz & Eibl-Eibesfeldt, 1959) (spotted garden eel)
 Heteroconger klausewitzi (Eibl-Eibesfeldt & Köster, 1983) (Galapagos garden eel)
 Heteroconger lentiginosus J. E. Böhlke & J. E. Randall, 1981 (masked garden eel)
 Heteroconger longissimus Günther, 1870 (brown garden eel)
 Heteroconger luteolus D. G. Smith, 1989 (yellow garden eel)
 Heteroconger mercyae G. R. Allen & Erdmann, 2009
 Heteroconger obscurus  (Klausewitz & Eibl-Eibesfeldt, 1959)
 Heteroconger pellegrini Castle, 1999 (mimic garden eel)
 Heteroconger perissodon J. E. Böhlke & J. E. Randall, 1981 (black garden eel)
 Heteroconger polyzona Bleeker, 1868 (zebra garden eel)
 Heteroconger taylori Castle & J. E. Randall, 1995 (Taylor's garden eel)
 Heteroconger tomberua Castle & J. E. Randall, 1999
 Heteroconger tricia Castle & J. E. Randall, 1999 (Tricia's garden eel)

References

 
Congridae
Marine fish genera
Taxa named by Pieter Bleeker